Club Hoy were an Australian Pop rock group formed in 1989. The group released one studio album, Thursday's Fortune in 1991.

History
Club Hoy formed in Sydney, in 1989, consisting of Penny Flanagan and Julia Richardson. The duo released their debut single "On and On," in 1990. Late that year, additional musicians Bernie Hayes (bass) and Vincent Sheehan (drums) joined the band. 

In early 1991, they released their second single, the double A-side "Da Da Da Da"/"Green and Blue". In September 1991, they released "House on Fire", as the lead single from their debut album, Thursday's Fortune. Another singles was released from Thursday's Fortune in 1992. 

In 1992, two EP were released, with Trumpets being promoted with the track "You Promised, You Said". In 1993, Club Hoy disbanded. 
Penny Flanagan went on to pursue a successful solo career, while Julia Richardson and Bernie Hayes formed a new group, the Troublemakers.

Discography

Albums

Extended plays

Singles

References

Australian pop rock groups
Musical groups from Sydney
Musical groups established in 1989
Musical groups disestablished in 1993